Ceriagrion olivaceum is a species of damselfly in the family Coenagrionidae. it is commonly known as rusty marsh dart. This species can be found in south and southeast Asia.

Subspecies
 Ceriagrion olivaceum olivaceum Laidlaw, 1914
 Ceriagrion olivaceum aurantiacum Fraser, 1924

Fraser described C. aurantiacum from southern India but later concluded that it was a subspecies or race of C. olivaceum. Asahina in his revision of Asian Ceriagrion compared both the specimens and decided to retain the race, stating the subapical tooth of superior caudal appendages differently shaped. C. o. olivaceum is widespread in India and Southeast Asia. C. o. aurantiacum is only known from southwest India.

Description and habitat 
It is a medium-sized damselfly with olivaceous brown capped greenish eyes. Its thorax is olive green, paler on the sides. Its abdomen is throughout olivaceous brown on dorsal half and paler on the ventral half. Its superior anal appendages are brown and triangular when seen from the dorsum. The apex broadly rounded. The inferiors are sloping strongly up to meet the superiors, broad at base and tapering to a point. Female is similar to the male. 
 
It breeds in slow running marshy streams, ponds, and swamps.

See also 
 List of odonates of India
 List of odonates of Sri Lanka
 List of odonata of Kerala

References

External links 

Coenagrionidae
Insects described in 1914